Ole Jørgen Halvorsen (born 2 October 1987) is a Norwegian professional footballer who plays as a midfielder for Sarpsborg 08.

Career
Halvorsen played for Sarpsborg 08 before moving to Sogndal in 2009.

Before the 2012 season he signed a contract with Fredrikstad.

In August 2013 he signed a contract with Odd.

On the last day of the Norwegian transfers he signed a loan deal with Bodø/Glimt.

Career statistics

Club

References

1987 births
Living people
People from Sarpsborg
Norwegian footballers
Association football midfielders
Sarpsborg 08 FF players
Sogndal Fotball players
Fredrikstad FK players
Odds BK players
FK Bodø/Glimt players
Norwegian First Division players
Eliteserien players
Sportspeople from Viken (county)